Synaptolaemus cingulatus is a species of headstander found in Brazil and Venezuela. An examination of specimens has shown that S. cingulatus is a synonym of S. latofasciatus.

References

 

Anostomidae
Fish of South America
Fish of Brazil
Fish of Venezuela
Taxa named by George S. Myers
Taxa named by Augustín Fernández-Yépez
Fish described in 1950